George Lehmann (born May 1, 1942) is an American former professional basketball player born in Riverside Township, New Jersey.

A 6'3" guard from Campbell University, Lehmann played in the NBA and ABA from 1967 to 1974 as a member of the St. Louis/Atlanta Hawks, Los Angeles Stars, New York Nets, Miami Floridians, Carolina Cougars, Memphis Pros, and Memphis Tams. He averaged 11.9 points per game and 4.5 assists per game in his professional career and holds the ABA's third best career three-point field goal percentage (.365). Lehmann was the first professional basketball player to make more than 40% of his three-point attempts in a season, which he did in 1970–71.

Since retiring as a player, Lehmann has hosted basketball clinics, worked for Pony Shoes, and owned a T-shirt business. His children, Nicole and Todd, played college basketball at North Carolina State University and Drexel University, respectively.

Notes

1942 births
Living people
Allentown Jets players
American men's basketball players
Atlanta Hawks players
Basketball players from New Jersey
Camden Catholic High School alumni
Campbell Fighting Camels basketball players
Carolina Cougars players
Junior college men's basketball players in the United States
Los Angeles Stars players
Memphis Pros players
Memphis Tams players
Miami Floridians players
New York Nets players
People from Riverside Township, New Jersey
Point guards
Shooting guards
Sportspeople from Camden County, New Jersey
St. Louis Hawks players
Undrafted National Basketball Association players